The figure skating events at the 1992 Winter Olympic Games were held at the Halle Olympique located next to the Théâtre des Cérémonies, two kilometres southwest of downtown Albertville.

The final placements were decided by factored placements. In the men's singles, ladies' singles and the pairs event, the short program (SP) was factored by 0.5, one-third (33.3%) of the total score, while the free skating (FS) was factored by 1.0, two-thirds (66.7%) of the total score. In ice dance, the two compulsory dances (CD) were factored by a total of 0.4 (0.2 each dance), which was 20% of the total score (10% each dance). The original dance (OD) was factored by 0.6 (30% of the total score), while the free dance (FD) was factored by 1.0 (50% of the total score). In the result of factored placements being tied, the free skating was the tie-breaker.

At the 1992 Winter Olympics, the short program was called the original program. The 1992 Winter Olympics was also the first time that the men's and ladies' events did not include a compulsory figures competition.

Medal table

Participant NOCs
Twenty eight nations sent figure skaters to compete in the events at Albertville.

Results

Men
13, 15 February 1992

Referee:
  Jürg Wilhelm

Assistant Referee:
  Tsaja Andrée

Judges:
  Frank Parsons
  Hely Abbondati
  Tatiana Danilenko
  Fabio Bianchetti
  Jean Matthews
  Felicitas Babusíková
  Hideo Sugita
  Hugh C. Graham Jr.
  Josette Betsch
  Wendy Utley (substitute)

Ladies
19, 21 February 1992

Referee:
  Benjamin T. Wright

Assistant Referee:
  Monique Georgelin

Judges:
  Reinhard Mirmseker
  Mary Pearson
  Yang Jiasheng
  Monique Petis
  Mieko Fujimori
  Ingelise Blangsted
  Felicitas Babusikova
  Vanessa Riley
  Marina Sanaya
  Maragaret Ann Wier (substitute)

Pairs
9, 11 February 1992

Referee:
  Walburga Grimm

Assistant Referee:
  Sally-Anne Stapleford

Judges:
  Anne Hardy-Thomas
  Felicitas Babusíková
  Frank Parsons
  Joan Gruber
  Ulf Denzer
  Dennis McFarlane
  Miranda Marchi
  Mikhail Drei
  Wendy Utley
  Hideo Sugita (substitute)

Ice dance
14, 16, 17 February 1992 
During a practice session on 10 February, Jacqueline Petr's right skate hit her left calf, requiring 22 stitches.

Referee:
  Lawrence Demmy

Assistant Referee:
  Lysiane Lauret

Judges:
  Elena Buriak
  Brenda Long-Simpson
  Marie Lundmark
  William McLachlan
  István Sugár
  Armelle van Eybergen
  Mary Louise Wright
  Olga Záková
  Olga Giardini
  Ulf Denzer (substitute)

References

External links
 Official Olympic Report
 results

 
1992 Winter Olympics events
1992
1992 in figure skating
International figure skating competitions hosted by France